The Russia men's national under-20 basketball team is a national basketball team of Russia, administered by the Russian Basketball Federation. It represented the country in international men's under-20 basketball competitions.

After the 2022 Russian invasion of Ukraine, FIBA banned Russian teams and officials from participating in FIBA basketball competitions.

FIBA U20 European Championship participations

See also
Russia men's national basketball team
Russia men's national under-19 basketball team
Russia women's national under-20 basketball team

References

External links
Archived records of Russia team participations

Basketball in Russia
u20
Basketball
Men's national under-20 basketball teams